Omninablautus arenosus is a species of robber flies in the family Asilidae.

Distribution
United States.

References

Asilidae
Insects described in 1935
Diptera of North America